The Fokker F28 Fellowship is a twin-engined, short-range jet airliner designed and built by Dutch aircraft manufacturer Fokker.

Following the Fokker F27 Friendship, an early and commercially successful turboprop-powered regional airliner, Fokker decided to embark on developing a new turbojet-powered commuter aircraft that would build upon its experiences with the F27. During the design phase, a high level of attention was paid to market research and operator concerns; amongst other changes made, the prospective jetliner was increased in size, changing its maximum seating capacity from 50 to 65 passengers. During April 1962, Fokker announced the formal launch of the F28 Fellowship.

On 9 May 1967, the prototype F28-1000 conducted its maiden flight. Type certification was achieved on 24 February 1969, and the first revenue-earning flight by Braathens was performed on 28 March 1969. Following its entry to service, Fokker developed multiple variants of the F28; one model, the F28-2000, featured an extended fuselage that could accommodate up to 79 passengers. A major revision was the F28-4000, which was powered by quieter Rolls-Royce Spey 555-15H engines, a redesigned cockpit, and a modified wing, and had a further increased seating capacity up to 85 passengers. During 1987, production of the type was terminated in favour of two newer derivatives, the Fokker 70 and the larger Fokker 100.

Development

By 1960, Dutch aircraft manufacturer Fokker was engaged in multiple programmes; these included military aircraft such as the Bréguet Br.1150 Atlantic and the Lockheed F-104 Starfighter, as well as the commercially successful turboprop-powered F27 Friendship airliner. Around this time, British European Airways (BEA) released a specification that called for a high-speed regional airliner powered by turbojet engines. In response, Fokker took an interest in developing its own turbojet-powered short-haul airliner. According to aviation publication Flying, Fokker's prospective jetliner design was heavily shaped by feedback and experiences from its existing customers of the F27, particularly those in the crucial North American market. As such, American design methodologies and preferences were incorporated, reportedly emphasising simplicity, as well as efforts to minimise both language and trade barriers.

During April 1962, Dutch aircraft manufacturer Fokker announced the launch of the F28 Fellowship. The programme was a collaborative effort conducted between a number of European companies, namely Fokker itself, West German aerospace companies Messerschmitt-Bölkow-Blohm (MBB) and VFW-Fokker, and Short Brothers of Northern Ireland. Substantial government funding was also invested in the project; reportedly, the Dutch government provided 50% of Fokker's stake, while the West German government contributed 60% of the overall 35% German stake. Fokker had also approached several other aviation companies with offers of involvement, including France's Sud Aviation and Britain's Hawker Siddeley.

Initial design work centered on an aircraft capable of transport a maximum of 50 passengers across distances  up to 1,650 km (1,025 mi), the design was later modified so that it could accommodate up to 65 seats in a five-abreast configuration, noticeably increasing its maximum takeoff weight, on the basis of market research. The enlarged aircraft was roughly comparable in capacity to that of the British Vickers Viscount, a successful turboprop airliner. The design was capable of speeds well in excess of turboprop-powered competitors, but retained a relatively low cruise speed in comparison to contemporary jet-powered designs, facilitating its use of a relatively straight low-mounted wing and achieving favourable low-speed characteristics as to enable the type's use from 85% of existing airports used by the F27 and the ubiquitous Douglas DC-3. According to Flying, the tentative airliner could achieve double the productivity of the preceding F27, while the company itself referred to the jetliner as a complement to its turboprop-powered sibling.

At one stage of development, Fokker had reportedly intended for the F28 to be powered by a pair of Bristol Siddeley BS.75 turbofans. However, when Fokker wanted to open contract negotiations,  Bristol Siddeley told them that engine was no longer available  as the market was too small when they lost the BAC 1-11 project. Rival British engine manufacturer Rolls-Royce, put forward their Rolls-Royce Spey Junior, a simplified version of the Rolls-Royce Spey. From the first prototype onwards the type would be exclusively powered by various models of the Spey engine.

The responsibility for both design and production of the F28 was divided between the partner companies. Fokker designed and built the nose section, centre fuselage, and inner wing; MBB/Fokker-VFW constructed the forward fuselage, rear fuselage, and tail assembly; while Shorts designed and produced the outer wings. Final assembly of the Fokker F28 was at Schiphol Airport in the Netherlands. At one point, American manufacturer Fairchild Aircraft had considered locally producing their own derivative of the F28, which was referred to as the Fairchild 228, but this ultimately did not reach production, with the company deciding to act as a distributor for the existing F28, instead. During 1987, production of the type was terminated in favour of two newer derivative airliners, the Fokker 70 and the larger  100; by this point, a total of 241 airframes had been constructed.

The F28-1000 prototype, registered PH-JHG, first flew on 9 May 1967, flown by Chief Test Pilot Jas Moll, Test Pilot Abe van der Schraaf, and Flight Engineer Cees Dik. Type certification from West German authorities was achieved on 24 February 1969, clearing the F28 to enter revenue service. While the first order for the type had been placed by German airline LTU, the first revenue-earning flight was conducted by Braathens, which eventually operated a fleet of five F28s, on 28 March 1969.

Design

The Fokker F28 Fellowship was a short-haul, twin-engined jetliner, sharing broad similarities to the British Aircraft Corporation's BAC One-Eleven built in the UK and the first-generation Douglas DC-9 built in the US in terms of basic configuration, featuring a T-tail and engines mounted at the rear of the fuselage. The choice of a low-mounted wing, amongst other benefits, somewhat shielded the tail-mounted engines from the threat of foreign object damage. Fuel is stored within both the outer wing and the fuselage; additional pylon-mounted tanks could be installed for extended range operations if so required. The structure, which features a fail-safe design, is constructed using the same bonding techniques previously pioneered for the F27.

The F28 was equipped with wings that had a slight crescent angle of sweep. It uses conventional box construction, being built in two pieces separately spliced onto the fuselage. The wing was furnished with ailerons positioned near the tips, along with simplistic flaps that would be supplemented by the ailerons during landing approaches; all of the flight control surfaces were actuated via duplicated cabling and (except for the rudder) aerodynamically balanced. It was also fitted with a five-section lift-dumper that would only be operated after landing, it was decided to employ a lift-dumper rather than alternatives such as thrust reversers, as the designers felt that this arrangement would result in a reduction in both weight and maintenance workload. Excluding the use of thrust reversers also meant that the chance of the engines ingesting debris was lessened when being operated upon unpaved airstrips. The wing also had a fixed leading edge (although one experimental model had leading edge slats and these were offered as an option) and was deiced via bleed air drawn from the engines.

The F28 is powered by a pair of Rolls-Royce Spey turbojet engines; dependent on model, these would be were capable of generating up to 9,850 lbf (43.9 kN) of thrust. While the feature was available at the time, Fokker chose not to equip the engines of early F28s with a water-methanol injection system, as they determined that the engines already possessed sufficient performance even when being flown under hot-and-high conditions. Most onboard systems are designed with simplicity in terms of operability and serviceability;  no hydraulic system was used, as actuation of the undercarriage and steering relied on pneumatic pumps, instead. However, the F28 was outfitted with comparatively advanced electronics, as Fokker's design team viewed this factor as directly relating to overall competitiveness.

One uncommon feature of the F28 was the movable split-sections installed on the tail cone; these would be hydraulically opened outwards to act as a variable air brake. A similar approach had also been used on the contemporaneous Blackburn Buccaneer strike fighter and on the later-built British Aerospace 146 regional airliner. The design is unique in that it not only slows the aircraft down rapidly, but also it can aid in rapid descents from economic cruising altitudes and also allowed the engines to be set at higher speeds, which helped eliminate lag time. This means the engines respond faster if needed for sudden speed increases or go-arounds on the approach to landing. The Fellowship had a retractable tricycle landing gear, which used large, low-pressure tyres, enabling the use of unpaved airstrips. The use of antiskid brakes on the main wheels of the undercarriage also contributed to a shorter landing run.

Variants

A variant of the F28, equipped with an extended fuselage, was named F28-2000; this model could seat up to 79 passengers instead of the 65 seats on the F28-1000. The prototype for this model was a converted F28-1000 prototype, and first flew on 28 April 1971. The models F28-6000 and -5000 were modified models of the F28-2000 and F28-1000, respectively; the main features of these models was the addition of slats, a greater wingspan, and the adoption of more powerful and quieter engines. Both the F28-6000 and -5000 failed to become commercial successes; only two F28-6000s and no F28-5000s were ultimately built. After being used by Fokker for a time, the F28-6000s were sold to Air Mauritanie, but not before being converted to F28-2000 standards.

Perhaps the most successful model of the F28 was the F28-4000, which debuted on 20 October 1976 with one of the world's largest Fokker operators, Linjeflyg. This version was powered by quieter Spey 555-15H engines, and had an increased seating capacity (up to 85 passengers), a larger wingspan with reinforced wings, a new cockpit, and a new "wide-look" interior featuring enclosed overhead lockers and a less 'tubular' look. The F28-3000, the successor to the F28-1000, featured the same improvements as the F28-4000.

 With a maximum capacity of 70 passengers, it was approved on 24 February 1969, the 1000C had a main-deck large cargo door.

F.28 Mk 2000 (F28-2000)
Though it first flew on 28 April 1971, and successfully began revenue service with Nigeria Airways in October 1971, only 10 were built.

F.28 Mk 3000 (F28-3000)
 A Mark 1000 with a  wingspan extension, it was approved on 19 July 1978, with a 3000C variant with a large main-deck cargo door. A successful variant, featuring greater structural strength and increased fuel capacity, it began revenue service with Garuda Indonesia.

F.28 Mk 4000 (F28-4000)
 Approved on 13 December 1976, it is built on the longer Mark 2000, with two overwing exits on both sides, a  wingspan extension, and capacity for 85 passengers. The first prototype appeared on 20 October 1976 and it began service with Linjeflyg (Sweden) at the end of the year.

F.28 Mk 5000 (F28-5000) This was to combine the shorter fuselage of the Mk 3000 and an increased wingspan. Leading edge slats were to be added to the wings and more powerful Rolls-Royce RB183 Mk555-15H engines were to be used. Although expected to be an excellent plane to operate on short runways due to its superior power, the project was abandoned.

F.28 Mk 6000 (F28-6000) It first flew on 27 September 1973, and had the longer fuselage of the Mk 2000/4000 with an increased wingspan and leading edge slats. It was certified in the Netherlands on 30 October 1975. Two were built by 1976.

F.28 Mk 6600 (F28-6600) Proposed version, not built

Fairchild 228 Proposed 50-seat American version to be assembled by Fairchild-Hiller with Rolls-Royce RB.203 Trent engines Project cancelled.

Operators

By 2019, no Fokker F28 aircraft remained in civil service.

Fly-SAX was the last airline operator of the F28 worldwide with the last aircraft in service stored in September 2019 due to lack of flight crew. Garuda Indonesia had the most F28s, with 62 of the aircraft in the former fleet. All have since been retired. Major operators included: MacRobertson Miller Airlines, Ansett Group Australia (more than 15), Toumaï Air Tchad (1), AirQuarius Aviation (3), SkyLink Arabia (1), Satena (1), Gatari Air Service (2), LADE (1), AirQuarius Aviation (4), Merpati Nusantara Airlines (1), and Biman Bangladesh Airlines (4). Some 22 airlines operated smaller numbers of the type. The F28s of Ansett Transport Industries' intrastate airline, MacRobertson Miller Airlines of Western Australia, flew the longest nonstop F28 route in the world, from Perth to Kununurra, in Western Australia – a distance of about 2,240 km (1,392 mi). This was also the world's longest twin-jet route at the time. MMA's F28's also had the highest use rates at the time, flying over 8 hours per day.

Current military/government operators

 LADE (2)

 Colombian Air Force (2)

Accidents and incidents

The following is a list of Fokker F28 accidents and incidents:
 Braathens SAFE Flight 239 – 23 December 1972, (Asker, suburb of Oslo, Norway): 41 fatalities - 40 immediately from the crash, and 1 in 1976 from injuries originally caused by the crash. First fatal crash of a Fokker Fellowship.
 Itavia – 1 January 1974, (Caselle Torinese, airport of Turin, Italy): 38 fatalities. Flight IH897 from Cagliari to Geneva with intermediate stops in Bologna and Turin, crashed about 2 miles south of Runway 36 while attempting to land in fog. Airplane involved was registered I-TIDE.
 Turkish Airlines Flight 301 – 26 January 1974, (Izmir, Turkey): 66 fatalities.
 Turkish Airlines Flight 345 – 30 January 1975 ( Istanbul Turkey) 42 fatalities. The aircraft crashed into the Marmara Sea on its second approach. The first approach failed when a power outage caused the runway lights to fail. Cause of the accident is unknown.
 Garuda Indonesia Airways Flight 150 – 24 September 1975 near Palembang, Indonesia: 26 fatalities. Crashed on approach in fog killing 25 people out of 61 passengers and crew. 1 person was killed on the ground.
 Turkish Airlines - 23 December 1979, 41 fatalities. Jet named "Trabzon" was destroyed that flew into the side of a hill nearby ESB airport from Samsun Airport (SSX). The crew had deviated from the localizer course while on an ILS approach.
 Garuda Indonesia Airways- 11 July 1979. 61 fatalities. Crashed into Mount Sibayak while on approach to Polonia International Airport. There was bad weather at the time of the crash.
 NLM CityHopper Flight 431 – 6 October 1981 (Moerdijk, North Brabant, Netherlands): 17 fatalities, the aircraft flew into a tornado which broke off one of the wings.
 Garuda Indonesia Domestic Flight – 20 March 1982, runway overrun at Tanjung Karang-Branti Airport in bad weather, 27 fatalities.
 Air Ontario Flight 1363 – 10 March 1989 (Dryden, Ontario, Canada): 24 fatalities. Due to various factors including snow, ice and lack of use of anti-icing measures.
 Korean Air Flight 175 - 25 November 1989 (Gimpo, South Korea) The plane was on a regularly scheduled flight from Seoul to Ulsan, improper flight preparation caused wing icing which, in turn, cause the number one engine to lose power on take-off. The pilot immediately lost directional control and aborted the take-off. However, the abort was so abrupt that the aircraft overran the runway and exploded in flames. The airframe was not salvageable after the fire was eventually extinguished and was written off. No one died in the crash.
 USAir Flight 405 – 22 March 1992 (Queens, New York, United States): 27 fatalities. Due to ice buildup on the wings, pilot error and improper deicing procedures at LaGuardia airport
 Merpati Nusantara Airlines Flight 724 – Fokker F-28 Mk-3000 Registered PK-GFU - 1 June 1993. Domestic Flight (Sorong, Papua, Indonesia): 41 fatalities. Controlled flight Into terrain - The aircraft crashed onto a rocky beach on Bad Weather Landing procedures at Jefman Airport
 Iran Aseman Airlines Flight 746 – 12 October 1994 (near Natanz, Iran): 66 fatalities.
 Air Mauritanie Flight 625 – 1 July 1994: All 4 crew and 76 of the 89 passengers on board were killed when their plane crashed at Tidjikja Airport.
On 28 October 1997, a Trigana Air Service Fokker F-28 Fellowship 3000 passenger plane returned to land at Jakarta–Soekarno–Hatta International Airport after the aircraft experienced technical problems two minutes after takeoff. Smoke and severe heat had entered the cockpit and the passenger cabin. The airplane sustained damage due to the heat.
 TANS Peru Flight 222 – 9 January 2003: None of the 41 passengers and 5 crew members aboard the Fokker F-28 survived after the aircraft hit a mountain near Chachapoyas, Peru.

Aircraft on display
Indonesia

 11117 – F28-3000 registered A-2803 on static display at Halim Perdanakusuma Air Force Base, Jakarta in Indonesian Air Force VIP livery.
 11175 – F28-4000 registered PK-MGJ preserved as a movie theater in Baturraden, Central Java.
Myanmar
 11114 – F28-4000 registered XY-ADW preserved as a bar at the Sky Palace Hotel in Naypyidaw.
 11161 – F28-4000 registered XY-AGH at the Defense Services Museum, Naypyidaw in Myanma Airways livery.
 11232 – F28-4000 registered XY-AGA at the Civil Aviation Training Institute, Yangon International Airport, Yangon.
Norway
 11009 – F28-1000 registered LN-SUC at the Norwegian Aviation Museum, Bodø in Braathens SAFE livery.
United States
 11016 – F28-1000 registered N500WN at Wayne Newton's Casa de Shenandoah, Las Vegas, Nevada.

Specifications

See also

References

Citations

Bibliography

 
 Eden, Paul E. "The World's Most Powerful Civilian Aircraft." Rosen Publishing Group, 2016. 
 May, Darryl. "Holland's Short-Haul Jet Transport." Flying Magazine, Vol. 72, No. 1. January 1963. pp. 25, 92-94. ISSN 0015-4806.

Further reading

 
 

1960s Dutch airliners
F 28
Twinjets
T-tail aircraft
Aircraft first flown in 1967